= Share Mania =

Board game

Share Mania is a board game published in 1988 by Perfect Games.

== Contents ==
Share Mania is a game in which a trading game using dice simulates the UK stock market.

== Reception ==
John Harrington reviewed Share Mania for Games International magazine, and gave it 3 stars out of 5, and stated that "The rules are commendably brief for what is, after all, intended to be a bright and breezy game, but there are some areas of confusion, particularly over the difference between a 'round' and a 'trading period'. As ever, common sense will resolve most issues."
